Preet Didbal is the former mayor of Yuba City, California. She was elected in 2014 and was the first Sikh female mayor in the United States. Her period of office was 2014-2018.
In November 2014, I was elected to the Yuba City Councilmember seat. The Council is the legislative body; its members are the community's decision makers. The power and authority is centralized in the elected council and focus on the overall community goals, major projects, and long-term considerations as community growth and review, approve city budget. My focus has been on building a foundation for children of academic, economic and social opportunity so that they may thrive. I spearhead quarterly Community Health and Safety forums in collaboration with local police, fire, schools and mental/public health agencies to educate the public. I also launched the first 2016 Summer at City Hall Program for high schools students to learn how their community and local and state governments work together. The students conducted a mock council meeting as their final project after 3 weeks of learning both in classroom environment at City Hall, job shadowing city employees and writing staff reports on issues of concern from their perspective and providing recommendations. Students also had an opportunity to speak with their Senator, Assemblymember, and Board of Supervisors. I presented students with Certification of Completion and high school credit.

Early life
Preet graduated from Yuba City High School and California State University in Sacramento. She received a master's degree in public administration (MPA) from the University of San Francisco.

References

American Sikhs
Punjabi people
university of San Francisco alumni
Year of birth missing (living people)
Living people
Mayors of places in California
People from Yuba City, California